Yury Pavlovich Gladkov (January 22, 1949 in Leningrad, Soviet Union – October 5, 2007 in Saint Petersburg) was a Saint Petersburg politician.

Since 1990 he has been a member of St. Petersburg Legislative Assembly and its predecessors. In 2003 he became the Deputy of its Speaker.

References and notes

External links
 Official biography (in Russian)

Politicians from Saint Petersburg
Members of Legislative Assembly of Saint Petersburg
1949 births
2007 deaths